Una Lillian Paisley (born 18 November 1922 in Kew in Melbourne in Victoria – died 1977 in Kew, Victoria) was an Australian cricket player. She played twelve Test matches for the Australia national women's cricket team. She captained the Australia national women's cricket team in four Test matches against New Zealand and England.

A right-handed batswoman and off break bowler, she played 12 Test matches in all from 1948 to 1961, scoring 471 runs with a best of 108, one of her two centuries. She also took 19 wickets at 22.94.

Test centuries

See also 
 List of centuries in women's Test cricket

References

1922 births
1977 deaths
Australia women Test cricketers
Women cricketers who made a century on Test debut
Cricketers from Melbourne
People from Kew, Victoria
Sportswomen from Victoria (Australia)